Deep canvassing is a form of canvassing that uses long empathic conversations to help shift someone's beliefs.

Origins 
The idea originated in 2012, at the Los Angeles LGBT Center when staffers decided to talk to people who voted against same sex marriage to understand them better. After the tactic was used in a pro-marriage-equality campaign in Minnesota, Steve Deline, Ella Barrett, and David Fleischer enlisted professors David Broockman and Josh Kalla to study the efficacy of the tactic.

With the support of People's Action, deep canvassing was used to engage with voters for the US 2020 presidential election.

Effectiveness 
In 2014, a paper by Michael J. LaCour, When contact changes minds, was released showing that canvassing conversation can change minds but was retracted the following year for having falsified data.

Kalla and Broockman's study, published in 2016, found that ten minute conversations did have an impact on residents’ views of transgender issues.

In 2017, Kalla and Broockman published another study that found brief door-to-door canvassing, had nearly zero effect on voting choices. Of their six studies, Kalla and Brookman have found that deep canvassing does have measurable effects.

It has been shown to be effective in person and over the phone.

In 2017 Changing the Conversation Together was launched as an organization of concerned citizens building a national corps of deep canvassers. This volunteer based and professionally led organization helped flip Staten Island in 2018 and Pennsylvania in 2020.

See also 

 Political campaigning

References 

Election campaigning